The Denver Broncos are a professional American football franchise based in Denver, Colorado. The Broncos compete in the National Football League (NFL) as a member club of the league's American Football Conference (AFC) West division. The team is headquartered in Dove Valley, Colorado.

The team began play in 1960 as a charter member of the American Football League (AFL) and joined the NFL as part of the merger in 1970. The Broncos are currently owned by the Walton-Penner group, and play their home games at Empower Field at Mile High; Denver previously played its home games at Mile High Stadium from its inception in 1960 through the 2000 season.

The Broncos were barely competitive during their 10-year run in the AFL and their first seven years in the NFL. They did not have a winning season until 1973 and qualified for their first playoffs in 1977, eventually advancing to Super Bowl XII that season. Since 1975, the Broncos have become one of the NFL's most successful teams, having suffered only eleven losing seasons. They have won eight AFC Championships, and three Super Bowl championships ( (XXXII),  (XXXIII),  (50), and share the NFL record for most Super Bowl losses (5 — tied with the New England Patriots). The Broncos have eight primary members enshrined in the Pro Football Hall of Fame: John Elway, Floyd Little, Shannon Sharpe, Gary Zimmerman, Terrell Davis, Champ Bailey, and Steve Atwater, along with late club owner Pat Bowlen.

Franchise history

Bob Howsman/Gerald Phipps era (1960–1980)
The Denver Broncos were founded on August 14, 1959, when minor league baseball owner Bob Howsam was awarded an American Football League (AFL) charter franchise. The Broncos won the first-ever AFL game over the Boston Patriots 13–10, on September 9, 1960. Seven years later on August 5, 1967, they became the first-ever AFL team to defeat an NFL team, with a 13–7 win over the Detroit Lions in a preseason game. However, the Broncos were not successful in the 1960s, winning more than five games only once (7–7, 1962), compiling a  record during the ten seasons of the AFL.

Denver came close to losing its franchise in 1965, until a local ownership group took control, and rebuilt the team. The team's first superstar, "Franchise" Floyd Little, was instrumental in keeping the team in Denver, due to his signing in 1967 as well as his Pro Bowl efforts on and off the field. The Broncos were the only original AFL team that never played in the title game, as well as the only original AFL team never to have a winning season while a member of the AFL during the upstart league's 10-year history.

In 1972, the Broncos hired former Stanford University coach John Ralston as their head coach. In 1973, he was the UPI's AFC Coach of the Year, after Denver achieved its first winning season at 7–5–2. In five seasons with the Broncos, Ralston guided the team to three winning seasons. Though Ralston finished the 1976 season with a 9–5 record, the team, as was the case in Ralston's previous winning seasons, still missed the playoffs. Following the season, several prominent players publicly voiced their discontent with Ralston, which soon led to his resignation.

Red Miller, a long-time assistant coach, was hired and along with the Orange Crush Defense (a nickname originated in 1977, also the brand of the popular orange-flavored soft drink) and aging quarterback Craig Morton, took the Broncos to what was then a record-setting 12–2 regular-season record and their first playoff appearance in 1977, and ultimately made their first Super Bowl appearance in Super Bowl XII, in which they were defeated by the Dallas Cowboys (Morton's former team), 27–10.

Edgar Kaiser/Pat Bowlen era (1981–2018) 
In 1981, Broncos' owner Gerald Phipps, who had purchased the team in May 1961 from the original owner Bob Howsam, sold the team to Canadian financier Edgar Kaiser Jr., grandson of shipbuilding industrialist Henry J. Kaiser. In 1984, the team was purchased by another Canadian, Pat Bowlen, who placed team ownership into a family trust sometime before 2004 and remained in day-to-day control until his battle with Alzheimer's disease forced him to cede the team to Joe Ellis in 2014.

Dan Reeves years (1981–1992) 
Dan Reeves became the youngest head coach in the NFL when he joined the Broncos in 1981 as vice president and head coach. Quarterback John Elway, who played college football at Stanford, arrived in 1983 via a trade. Originally drafted by the Baltimore Colts as the first pick of the draft, Elway proclaimed that he would shun football in favor of baseball (he was drafted by the New York Yankees to play center field and was also a pitching prospect), unless he was traded to a selected list of other teams, which included the Broncos. Prior to Elway, the Broncos had over 24 different starting quarterbacks in its 23 seasons to that point.

Reeves and Elway guided the Broncos to six post-season appearances, five AFC West divisional titles, three AFC championships and three Super Bowl appearances (Super Bowl XXI, XXII and XXIV) during their 12-year span together. The Broncos lost Super Bowl XXI to the New York Giants, 39–20; Super Bowl XXII to the Washington Redskins, 42–10; and Super Bowl XXIV to the San Francisco 49ers, 55–10; the latter score remains the most lopsided scoring differential in Super Bowl history. The last year of the Reeves-Elway era were marked by feuding, due to Reeves taking on play-calling duties after ousting Elway's favorite offensive coordinator Mike Shanahan after the 1991 season, as well as Reeves drafting quarterback Tommy Maddox out of UCLA instead of going with a wide receiver to help Elway. Reeves was fired after the 1992 season and replaced by his protégé and friend Wade Phillips, who had been serving as the Broncos' defensive coordinator. Phillips was fired after a mediocre 1994 season, in which management felt he lost control of the team.

Mike Shanahan years (1995–2008) 
In 1995, Mike Shanahan, who had formerly served under Reeves as the Broncos' offensive coordinator, returned as head coach. Shanahan drafted rookie running back Terrell Davis. In 1996, the Broncos were the top seed in the AFC with a 13–3 record, dominating most of the teams that year. The fifth-seeded Jacksonville Jaguars, however, upset the Broncos 30–27 in the divisional round of the playoffs, ending the Broncos' 1996 run.

Super Bowl XXXII champions (1997) 
During the 1997 season, Elway and Davis helped guide the Broncos to their first Super Bowl victory, a 31–24 win over the defending champion Green Bay Packers in Super Bowl XXXII. Though Elway completed only 13 of 22 passes, throwing one interception and no touchdowns (he did, however, have a rushing touchdown), Davis rushed for 157 yards and a Super Bowl-record three touchdowns to earn the Super Bowl Most Valuable Player Award—this while overcoming a severe migraine headache that caused him blurred vision.

Super Bowl XXXIII champions (1998) 
The Broncos repeated as Super Bowl champions the following season, defeating the Atlanta Falcons (led by Elway's longtime head coach Dan Reeves) in Super Bowl XXXIII, 34–19. Elway was named Super Bowl MVP, completing 18 of 29 passes for 336 yards, with an 80-yard touchdown to wide receiver Rod Smith and one interception.
John Elway retired following the 1998 season, and Brian Griese started at quarterback for the next four seasons. After a 6–10 record in 1999, mostly due to a season-ending injury to Terrell Davis, the Broncos recovered in 2000, earning a Wild Card playoff berth, but losing to the eventual Super Bowl champion Baltimore Ravens. After missing the playoffs the following two seasons, former Arizona Cardinals' quarterback Jake Plummer replaced Griese in 2003, and led the Broncos to two straight 10–6 seasons, earning Wild Card playoff berths both years. However, the Broncos went on the road to face the Indianapolis Colts in back-to-back seasons and were blown out by more than 20 points in each game, allowing a combined 90 points.

In the years following the back-to-back championships, a league investigation revealed that the team had cheated the salary cap in both seasons and the 1996 season by deferring additional money to Elway and Davis outside of the salary cap. In addition, they purposefully avoided waiving certain players before a certain date. Denver claimed the moves did not give them additional competitive avantage. Between two separate punishments, they were stripped of their third-round picks in both the 2002 and 2005 drafts and fined nearly $2 million combined. 

Plummer led the Broncos to a 13–3 record in 2005 and their first AFC West division title since 1998. After a first-round bye, the Broncos defeated the defending Super Bowl champion New England Patriots, 27–13, denying New England from becoming the first NFL team ever to win three consecutive Super Bowl championships. They were the first team to beat the Patriots in the playoffs during the Tom Brady era. The Broncos' playoff run came to an end the next week, after losing at home to the Pittsburgh Steelers in the AFC Championship game, 34–17. The Steelers went on to win Super Bowl XL.

The Broncos' defense began the first five games of the 2006 season allowing only one touchdown - an NFL record that still stands. ESPN commentator and Super Bowl-winning QB Joe Theismann gave the 2006 defense the name “Bad Blue” on Monday Night Football as they played the Ravens. However, the team struggled down the season stretch. Plummer led the team to a 7–2 record, but struggled individually with inconsistent performance and more interceptions than touchdown passes. As a result, he would be replaced by rookie quarterback Jay Cutler. Cutler went 2–3 as a starter, and the Broncos finished with a 9–7 record, losing the tiebreaker to the Kansas City Chiefs for the final playoff spot. Cutler's first full season as a starter in 2007 became the Broncos' first losing season since 1999, with a 7–9 record.

The 2008 season ended in a 52–21 loss at the San Diego Chargers, giving the Broncos an 8–8 record and their third straight season out of the playoffs. Mike Shanahan, the longest-tenured and most successful head coach in Broncos' franchise history, was fired after 14 seasons.

Josh McDaniels years (2009–2010) 
On January 11, 2009, two weeks after Shanahan was fired, the Broncos hired former New England Patriots' offensive coordinator Josh McDaniels as the team's new head coach. Three months later, the team acquired quarterback Kyle Orton as part of a trade that sent Jay Cutler to the Chicago Bears.

Under McDaniels and Orton, the Broncos jumped out to a surprising 6–0 start in 2009. However, the team lost eight of their next ten games, finishing 8–8 for a second consecutive season and missing the playoffs. The next season (2010), the Broncos set a new franchise record for losses in a single season, with a 4–12 record. McDaniels was fired before the end of the 2010 season following a combination of the team's poor record and the fallout from a highly publicized videotaping scandal. Running backs coach Eric Studesville was named interim coach for the final four games of the 2010 season. He chose to start rookie first-round draft choice Tim Tebow at quarterback for the final three games.

John Fox years (2011–2014) 
Following the 2010 season, Joe Ellis was promoted from Chief Operating Officer to team president, while John Elway returned to the organization as the team's Executive Vice President of Football Operations. In addition, the Broncos hired John Fox as the team's 14th head coach. Fox previously served as the Carolina Panthers' head coach from 2002 to 2010.

Following a 1–4 start to the 2011 season, Tim Tebow replaced Kyle Orton as the Broncos' starting quarterback, and “Tebow Time” was born. Tebow led the Broncos with toughness, determination and miraculous come-from-behind victories which gave the Broncos hope and were the catalyst for better things to come. Tebow led the Broncos to an 8–8 record and garnered the team's first playoff berth and division title since 2005. The Broncos defeated the Pittsburgh Steelers in the Wild Card round on a memorable 80-yard touchdown pass from Tebow to wide receiver Demaryius Thomas on the first play of overtime, setting a record for the fastest overtime in NFL history. However, the Broncos lost to the New England Patriots in the Divisional round.

In March 2012, the Broncos reached an agreement on a five-year, $96 million contract with former longtime Indianapolis Colts' quarterback Peyton Manning, who had recently missed the entire  season following multiple neck surgeries. This resulted in the Broncos subsequently trading incumbent quarterback Tim Tebow to the New York Jets. The Broncos finished with a 13–3 record and the AFC's No. 1 seed in the 2012 playoffs, but were defeated by the Baltimore Ravens in the Divisional round.

Like in 2012, the 2013 Broncos finished with a 13–3 record and the AFC's No. 1 seed. The Broncos broke all offensive records and QB Peyton Manning shattered many QB records that season as well. In the 2013 playoffs, they defeated the San Diego Chargers in the Divisional round and the New England Patriots in the AFC Championship. However, the Broncos lost to the Seattle Seahawks in Super Bowl XLVIII by a score of 43–8, the Broncos' first Super Bowl berth since winning back-to-back Super Bowls in 1997 and 1998.

Prior to the start of the 2014 season, the Broncos announced that Pat Bowlen, the team's owner since 1984, relinquished control of the team due to his battle with Alzheimer's disease, resulting in team president Joe Ellis and general manager John Elway assuming control of the team. The Broncos finished the 2014 season with a 12–4 record and the AFC's No. 2 seed. However, the Broncos were defeated by the Indianapolis Colts in the Divisional round of the 2014 playoffs, marking the third time in four seasons that the Broncos lost in the Divisional round of the playoffs. Quarterback Peyton Manning had been playing with strained quadriceps for the final month of the 2014 season.

Gary Kubiak years (2015–2016) 
On January 12, 2015, one day after the divisional playoff loss to the Colts, the Broncos and head coach John Fox mutually agreed to part ways. Fox left the Broncos with a .719 winning percentage in his four seasons as the Broncos' head coach—the highest in franchise history. One week later, the Broncos hired Gary Kubiak as the team's 15th head coach. Kubiak served as a backup quarterback to executive vice president/general manager John Elway from 1983 to 1991, as well as the Broncos' offensive coordinator from 1995 to 2005.

Super Bowl 50 champions (2015) 
Shortly after Kubiak became head coach, the Broncos underwent numerous changes to their coaching staff and players, including the hiring of defensive coordinator, defensive mastermind Wade Phillips, under whom the Broncos' defense went from middle of the road to being ranked No. 1 in the NFL. By the 2015 season, it would go on to be considered one of the greatest NFL defenses of all time - along with the 1985 Bears, 2000 Ravens and 2002 Buccaneers. Backup quarterback Brock Osweiler started the last six games of the regular season due to Manning suffering from a foot injury. Manning led the Broncos throughout the playoffs. The Broncos defeated the Pittsburgh Steelers 23–16 in the Divisional Round and the New England Patriots 20–18 in the AFC Championship. They were victorious against the Carolina Panthers 24–10 in Super Bowl 50 for their third Super Bowl title.

On March 7, 2016, quarterback Peyton Manning retired after 18 NFL seasons during a press conference at the team's Dove Valley headquarters. 

Following Manning's retirement, the Broncos scrambled to find the team's next starting quarterback after backup quarterback Brock Osweiler departed on a four-year contract to the Houston Texans. The Broncos acquired Mark Sanchez from the Philadelphia Eagles and selected Paxton Lynch during the 2016 draft. Sanchez, Lynch and second-year quarterback Trevor Siemian competed for the starting quarterback spot during the off-season and preseason. Prior to the regular season, Sanchez was released and Siemian was named the starter. The Broncos finished the season 9–7 and missed the playoffs for the first time since 2010. 

On January 2, 2017, coach Gary Kubiak announced his retirement, citing health as the main reason for retiring. The Broncos hired Miami Dolphins defensive coordinator Vance Joseph as head coach on January 11, 2017. The Broncos finished 5–11 in 2017 as a result of an unimpressive offense led by a quarterback committee of Trevor Siemian, Brock Osweiler, and Paxton Lynch. 

In an effort to address poor production from the offense, the Broncos signed quarterback Case Keenum on March 14, 2018, and traded away Trevor Siemian to the Minnesota Vikings on March 19, 2018. 

On May 1, 2018, the Broncos signed local undrafted free agent running back Phillip Lindsay, who became a fan favorite due to his underdog mentality, explosive play style and local roots. Lindsay became the first undrafted player in NFL history with 100+ scrimmage yards in each of their first two games and on December 18, 2018, Lindsay was voted to the 2019 Pro Bowl, making him the first undrafted offensive rookie in NFL history to be voted to a Pro Bowl.

After getting off to a strong start, their 2018 season was up and down, eventually finishing with a 6–10 record and placing third in the AFC West. Coupled with the 5–11 season in 2017, the Broncos had back-to-back losing seasons for the first time since 1971–1972. Shortly after the conclusion of the regular season, head coach Vance Joseph was fired after recording a poor 11–21 record in two seasons.

Vic Fangio years (2019–2021) 

On January 10, 2019, the Broncos hired Chicago Bears defensive coordinator Vic Fangio to become the 17th head coach in franchise history. Fangio was chosen over Mike Munchak, the Broncos' offensive line coach. Fangio received a four-year contract with a team option for an additional season. 

On February 13, 2019, Joe Flacco was announced as the new starting quarterback. On October 6, 2019, the Broncos defeated the Los Angeles Chargers for their 500th win, bringing their win–loss record to 500–432. 

On December 1, 2019, the Broncos started Mizzou rookie quarterback Drew Lock for the first time. He led the Broncos to a 4–1 record to end the 2019 season. The Broncos finished 2nd place in the AFC West Division at 7–9, missing the playoffs for a fourth consecutive year. In five games, Lock finished with 1,020 passing yards, seven touchdowns, and three interceptions.

Due to the COVID-19 pandemic, the 2020 NFL season did not have a preseason or full training camps, which likely contributed to an abnormally large amount of injuries that plagued the Broncos and other NFL teams. Star linebacker Von Miller suffered a season-ending ankle tendon injury before the regular season started, and starting wide receiver Courtland Sutton suffered a season-ending torn ACL during a week two game. 

On November 29, 2020, after all three of the Broncos' quarterbacks were placed in COVID-19 protocol, the Broncos were forced to turn to undrafted wide receiver and former college quarterback Kendall Hinton as the emergency quarterback. Hinton completed only one pass for 13 yards in 9 attempts—the fewest pass completions in a single game in franchise history—and was intercepted twice. The Broncos' only scoring play was a 58-yard field goal by placekicker Brandon McManus in a 31–3 loss to the New Orleans Saints. In July 2021, the Pro Football Hall of Fame announced that Hinton's quarterback wristband would be added to the Hall of Fame as part of a display.

The Broncos finished the 2020 season with a record of 5–11, last in the AFC West, and missed the playoffs for the fifth consecutive year.

Following another season of uninspiring quarterback performances, the Broncos were the subject of multiple quarterback trade rumors during the 2021 offseason. Aaron Rodgers and Deshaun Watson were two names rumored to be of interest for the Broncos, but ultimately the Broncos traded for quarterback Teddy Bridgewater on April 28, 2021. Bridgewater won the subsequent quarterback competition between himself and Drew Lock during the preseason, and he was named the Broncos' starting quarterback on August 25, 2021.

The Broncos also made notable improvements in the defensive secondary, signing former All-Pro cornerback Kyle Fuller and cornerback Ronald Darby, as well as drafting Alabama cornerback Patrick Surtain II with the ninth overall pick in the 2021 NFL Draft. Running back Phillip Lindsay was replaced by UNC rookie running back Javonte Williams, who was drafted in the second round of the 2021 NFL Draft by the Broncos.

On October 31, 2021, Peyton Manning (who won two AFC Championships, Super Bowl 50, and an NFL MVP during his four seasons as a Bronco) was inducted to the Broncos' Ring of Fame during a game against Washington.

On November 1, 2021, the Broncos traded franchise legend Von Miller to the Los Angeles Rams in exchange for a 2nd and 3rd round pick in the 2022 NFL Draft. At the time of the trade, Miller was the longest-tenured Bronco on the team, and the only remaining non-special teams player from Denver's Super Bowl 50 roster.

After another mediocre performance in the 2021 season with the Broncos going 7–10, head coach Vic Fangio was dismissed on January 8, 2022, after losing to the Kansas City Chiefs. The Broncos announced the hiring of Green Bay Packers offensive coordinator Nathaniel Hackett as head coach on January 27, 2022.

The Broncos then announced on February 1, 2022, that they were now up for sale and that they would be parting ways with the Bowlen family, the former owners of the franchise.

Hackett's first hire as head coach was Justin Outten as offensive coordinator. He was hired on February 2, 2022.

On March 16, 2022, the Broncos traded Drew Lock, Noah Fant, Shelby Harris, Denver's 2022 first-round pick (No. 9), its 2022 second-round pick (No. 40), its 2023 first- and second-round picks, and its 2022 fifth-round round pick for Russell Wilson and the Seattle Seahawks' 2022 fourth-round pick.

Walton-Penner Era (2022–present) 

On June 7, 2022, the Broncos announced that the Walton-Penner family, led by Rob Walton, had entered in an agreement to acquire the Denver Broncos for $4.65 billion (a North American record) subject to approval by the NFL Finance Committee and 3/4 of the league's team owners. The Broncos announced that Condoleezza Rice would join the ownership group on July 11, 2022.

On August 10, 2022, the Broncos formally introduced the new ownership group to the media and Denver community. The full group comprises Rob Walton, Carrie Walton Penner, Greg Penner, Mellody Hobson, Condoleezza Rice and Lewis Hamilton. 

On December 26, with the Broncos sitting at 4–11 following a 51–14 Christmas Day loss to the Los Angeles Rams, Hackett was fired and replaced by interim head coach Jerry Rosburg. He became the fifth head coach to not finish his first season after Lou Holtz in 1976, Pete McCulley in 1978, Bobby Petrino in 2007, and Urban Meyer in 2021. Jerry Rosburg was released from the staff on January 25.

Rivalries

Divisional

The Denver Broncos have three AFC West rivals—the Kansas City Chiefs, Las Vegas Raiders and Los Angeles Chargers. All teams, along with the Broncos, were charter members of the American Football League (AFL), with each team placed in the AFL Western Division. The Broncos were barely competitive during the AFL years (1960–69), going a combined 10–49–1 against the Chiefs, Chargers and Raiders.

Kansas City Chiefs

The Broncos have had several memorable matchups with the Chiefs, particularly during the years in which John Elway was the Broncos' starting quarterback (1983–98). The Broncos defeated the Chiefs at Arrowhead Stadium in the divisional round of the 1997 NFL playoffs, en route to their first Super Bowl victory. The Chiefs currently hold a 69–55 series lead over the Broncos, including the aforementioned 1997 divisional playoff game.

Las Vegas Raiders

The rivalry intensified in the mid-1990s, when Mike Shanahan was hired as the Broncos' head coach in 1995. Shanahan coached the Raiders in  before being fired four games into the  season. The Raiders currently hold a 70–54–2 series lead over the Broncos, including 1–1 in the playoffs.

Los Angeles Chargers

Unlike their records against the Chiefs and Raiders, the Broncos currently have a winning record against the Chargers, with a 70–54–1 series lead, including 1–0 in the playoffs. The Broncos pulled off one of the largest comebacks in Monday Night Football history, when Peyton Manning led the Broncos from a 24–0 halftime deficit to a 35–24 win at San Diego's Qualcomm Stadium during the  season. The two teams met in the playoffs for the first time on January 12, 2014, at Denver's Sports Authority Field at Mile High, with the Broncos winning 24–17.

Historical
Aside from the aforementioned AFC West teams, the Broncos have had intra-conference rivalries over the years with the Cleveland Browns, Pittsburgh Steelers and New England Patriots.  The Broncos and Seattle Seahawks were also former AFC West rivals from 1977–2001, after which Seattle was realigned to the NFC West.

Cleveland Browns

The Broncos had a brief rivalry with the Browns that arose from three AFC championship matches in 1986, 1987 and 1989. In the 1986 AFC Championship, quarterback John Elway led The Drive to secure a tie in the waning moments at Cleveland Municipal Stadium; the Broncos went on to win in 23–20 in overtime. One year later, the two teams met again in the 1987 AFC Championship at Mile High Stadium. Denver took a 21–3 lead, but Browns' quarterback Bernie Kosar threw four touchdown passes to tie the game at 31–31 halfway through the 4th quarter. After a long drive, John Elway threw a 20-yard touchdown pass to running back Sammy Winder to give Denver a 38–31 lead. Cleveland advanced to Denver's 8-yard line with 1:12 left, but Broncos' safety Jeremiah Castille stripped Browns' running back Earnest Byner of the football at the 2-yard line—a play that has been called The Fumble by Browns' fans. The Broncos recovered it, gave Cleveland an intentional safety, and went on to win 38–33. The two teams met yet again in the 1989 AFC Championship at Mile High Stadium, which the Broncos easily won by a score of 37–21. The Broncos did not win the Super Bowl after any of the championship games where they defeated the Browns, losing by an aggregate of 136–40.

Pittsburgh Steelers

As of the end of the  season, the Broncos and Steelers have met in postseason play eight times, tied with five other pairings for the second–most frequent playoff matchups in NFL playoff history. The Broncos currently own a 5–3 playoff record vs. the Steelers. Perhaps the most memorable postseason matchup occurred in the 1997 AFC Championship, in which the Broncos defeated the Steelers 24–21 at Three Rivers Stadium, en route to their first Super Bowl victory. Eight years later, the Steelers returned the favor at INVESCO Field at Mile High, defeating the Broncos 34–17 in the 2005 AFC Championship, and subsequently won Super Bowl XL. In the Wild Card round of the 2011 playoffs, in a game dubbed The 3:16 game, the Broncos stunned the Steelers 29–23 on the first play of overtime, when quarterback Tim Tebow connected with wide receiver Demaryius Thomas on an 80-yard game-winning touchdown pass. The teams met again in the Divisional round of the 2015 playoffs at Denver, where the Broncos defeated the Steelers 23–16 on their way to a victory in Super Bowl 50.

New England Patriots

The Broncos and Patriots met twice annually during the American Football League (AFL) years from 1960 to 1969, and played in the first-ever AFL game on September 9, 1960. Since , the two teams have met frequently during the regular season, including nine consecutive seasons from 1995 to 2003. As of the end of the  season, the two teams have met in the playoffs five times, with the Broncos owning a 4–1 record. The teams' first playoff match on January 4, 1987, was John Elway's first career playoff win, while the teams' second playoff match on January 14, 2006, game was the Broncos' first playoff win since Elway's retirement after the 1998 season. The game was also notable for Champ Bailey's 100-yard interception that resulted in a touchdown-saving tackle by Benjamin Watson at the 1-yard line. On October 11, 2009, the two teams met with former Patriots' offensive coordinator, Josh McDaniels as the Broncos' head coach. Both teams wore their AFL 50th anniversary jerseys. The game featured a 98-yard drive in the fourth quarter, with a game-tying touchdown pass from Kyle Orton to Brandon Marshall, followed by an overtime drive led by Orton that resulted in a 41-yard game-winning field goal by Matt Prater. The two teams met in the Divisional round of the 2011 playoffs, with the Patriots blowing out Tim Tebow and the Broncos by a score of 45–10. The Broncos' rivalry with the Patriots later intensified when longtime Indianapolis Colts' quarterback Peyton Manning became the Broncos' starting quarterback from 2012 to 2015. Manning and Patriots' quarterback Tom Brady maintained a legendary rivalry from  until Manning's retirement after the  season. Though Brady dominated Manning in regular season play, winning nine of twelve meetings, Manning won three of five playoff meetings, including the Broncos' 26–16 win in the 2013 AFC Championship and the Broncos' 20–18 win in the 2015 AFC Championship.

Seattle Seahawks

The Broncos had an old rivalry with the Seattle Seahawks, who were members of the AFC West from 1977 to 2001, prior to the Seahawks' move to the NFC West as part of the NFL's  re-alignment. During the 25 years in which the Seahawks resided in the AFC West, the Broncos went 32–18 against the Seahawks, including a loss at Seattle in the 1983 NFL playoffs. Since 2002, the Broncos have won three of five interconference meetings, and the two teams met in Super Bowl XLVIII on February 2, 2014, with the Seahawks winning by a score of 43–8.

Facilities

For most of their history, the Denver Broncos played in Mile High Stadium. The AFL Broncos played at the University of Denver's Hilltop Stadium from time to time, including the first victory of an AFL team over an NFL team: The Broncos beat the Detroit Lions on August 5, 1967, in a preseason game.

During home games, the attendance is announced to the crowd, along with the number of no-shows (the fans subsequently boo the no-shows). The fans are also known to chant "IN-COM-PLETE!" every time the visiting team throws an incomplete pass. The stadium's legendary home-field advantage is regarded as one of the best in the NFL, especially during the playoffs. The Broncos had the best home record in pro football over a 32-year span from 1974 to 2006 (191–65–1). Mile High Stadium was one of the NFL's loudest stadiums, with steel flooring instead of concrete, which may have given the Broncos an advantage over opponents, plus the advantage of altitude conditioning for the Broncos. In , the team moved into then-named Invesco Field at Mile High, built next to the former site of the since-demolished Mile High Stadium. Sportswriter Woody Paige, along with many of Denver's fans, however, often refused to call the stadium by its full name, preferring to use "Mile High Stadium" because of its storied history and sentimental import. Additionally, The Denver Post had an official policy of referring to the stadium as simply "Mile High Stadium" in protest, but dropped this policy in 2004.

Prior to the 2011 season, Englewood-based sporting goods retailer Sports Authority claimed the naming rights of Invesco Field, which became known as Sports Authority Field at Mile High. However, in the summer of 2016, Sports Authority went bankrupt, the stadium was renamed Broncos Stadium at Mile High, and the Broncos sought out a naming rights sponsor until September 2019 when they agreed to rename the stadium Empower Field at Mile High.

The altitude has also been attributed as part of the team's home success. The team training facility, the UCHealth Training Center (formerly known as the Paul D. Bowlen Memorial Broncos Centre), is a state-of-the-art facility located in Dove Valley. With  of property, the facility hosts three full-size fields, a complete weight and training facility, and a cafeteria.

In their more than half-century of existence, the Broncos have never been shut out at home, a streak of over 400 games as of the  season.

In late 2012, the Broncos announced that the stadium would receive $30 million upgrades including a new video board in the south end zone three times larger than the previous display. The renovations were finished before kickoff of the 2013 season.

Logos and uniforms

1968–1996

They featured white and mustard yellow jerseys, with contrasting brown helmets, brown pants and vertically striped socks. Two years later, the team unveiled a new logo featuring a bucking horse, and changed their team colors to orange, royal blue and white. The  uniform consisted of white pants, orange helmets, and either orange or white jerseys.

In , the Broncos debuted a design that became known as the "Orange Crush". Their logo was redesigned so that the horse was coming out of a "D." Additionally, the helmets were changed to royal blue, with thin stripes placed onto the sleeves, and other minor modifications were added. From 1969 to 1971, and again from 1978 to 1979, the team wore orange pants with their white jerseys. The facemasks became white (from grey) in 1975.

The Broncos wore their white jerseys at home throughout the  season, as well as for  home games vs. the San Diego Chargers and Dallas Cowboys, the latter in hopes to bring out the "blue jersey jinx" which has followed the Cowboys for decades (it worked, the Broncos won 41–20). The Broncos wore their white jerseys for  home games vs. the Philadelphia Eagles, Los Angeles Raiders and Cincinnati Bengals, but did not wear white at home again for two decades — see next section.

In , in honor of the 75th anniversary season of the NFL, the Broncos wore their  throwback uniforms for two games—a Week 3 home game against the Raiders, as well a road game at the Buffalo Bills the following week.

1997–2011

The new logos and uniforms were unveiled on February 4, 1997. Navy blue replaced royal blue on the team's color scheme. The current logo is a profile of a horse's head, with an orange mane and navy blue outlines. The Broncos' popular live animal mascot Thunder was the inspiration to incorporate a horse-head profile as part of the logo on the team's helmets. During a February 4, 1997, press conference introducing the new logo, the team president and the art director for Nike, who were the creators of the new design, described it as "a powerful horse with a fiery eye and mane."

The Broncos began wearing navy blue jerseys, replacing their longtime orange jerseys that had been the team's predominant home jersey color since 1962. This new uniform design features a new word mark, numbering font and a streak that runs up and down the sides of both the jerseys and the pants. On the navy blue jerseys, the streak is orange, with an orange collar and white numerals trimmed in orange, while on the road white jerseys, the streak is navy blue, with a thin orange accent strip on both sides, a navy collar and navy numerals trimmed in orange; the helmet facemasks became navy blue. When they debuted, these uniforms were vilified by the press and fans, until the Broncos won their first-ever Super Bowl in the new design that same season. The navy blue jerseys served as the team's primary home jersey until the end of the  season — see next section.

In , the Broncos introduced an alternate orange jersey that is a mirror image of the aforementioned navy blue jerseys, but with orange and navy trading places. Like the road white jerseys, the white pants with the navy blue streaks running down the sides are worn with this uniform. This jersey was used only once in the 2002 and  seasons, and were used twice per season from 2008 to 2011. Mike Shanahan, the team's head coach from 1995 to 2008, was not a big fan of the alternate orange jerseys.

Though they were part of the uniform change in 1997 (in fact, they were worn for a couple of 1997 preseason games) and most players wanted to wear them, the only player who vetoed wearing them was John Elway, thereby delaying their eventual introduction. From 2003 to 2011, these pants were primarily used for select prime-time and late-season home games (excluding the  season), and since , are used exclusively with the now-alternate navy blue jerseys — see next section.

On November 16, 2003, the Broncos wore their white jerseys at home for the first time since , in a game vs. the San Diego Chargers. This was compensation for a uniform mix-up, after the teams' first meeting at San Diego's Qualcomm Stadium in Week 2 earlier that season, when the Chargers were the team that was supposed to declare their uniform color. The Chargers were planning to wear their white jerseys, but the visiting Broncos came to the stadium in white, and were fined $25,000 by the NFL as a result. When the two teams met at INVESCO Field at Mile High later that season (Week 11), the NFL allowed the visiting Chargers to choose their uniform color in advance, and they chose navy blue, forcing the Broncos to wear their white jerseys at home.

In , in honor of their 50th anniversary season as one of the eight original American Football League teams, the Broncos wore their 1960 throwback uniforms (brown helmets, mustard yellow and brown jerseys) for games against two fellow AFL rivals—a Week 5 home game vs. the New England Patriots, as well as the following week at the San Diego Chargers.

2012–present
The change was made due to overwhelming popularity with the fans, who pressured the Broncos to return to orange as the team's primary home jersey color. The team will either wear the navy blue or the white pants — with the orange side stripes — to match with the alternate navy blue jerseys. The team initially did not wear the white pants with the orange side stripes, until a November 1, 2015, game vs. the Green Bay Packers, in which the Broncos wore said design in order to match the uniform ensemble that was used during the team's Super Bowl XXXII win over the Packers. On October 30, 2022, the Broncos debuted a new combination of white jerseys and alternate navy blue pants in an NFL London Game at the Jacksonville Jaguars, with mismatched side stripes of navy blue (white jersey) and orange (navy blue pants).

As the designated home team in Super Bowl 50, the Broncos — who have a 0–4 Super Bowl record when using their standard orange jerseys — chose to wear their white jerseys as the designated "home" team.

In , the Broncos' unveiled a new Color Rush uniform, which the team wore for a Thursday Night game at the San Diego Chargers on October 13, 2016. The uniform kit contained the following features: orange pants, which the team wore for the first time since 1979, orange socks and shoes, along with block-style numerals trimmed in navy blue that mirrored the team's 1968–1996 uniform style. Due to the NFL's one-helmet rule implemented in 2013, the helmets remained the same, with the team temporarily replacing the modern primary logo with the throwback "D-horse" logo. The same uniform was used for a Thursday night game against the Indianapolis Colts during the  season and again during a 2018 game against the Pittsburgh Steelers.

Super Bowl jersey colors

Statistics and records

Season-by-season records

Players of note

Current roster

50th Anniversary Team (2009)
The Denver Broncos announced the club's 50th anniversary team on September 15, 2009. The anniversary team was voted on by users at DenverBroncos.com from June 6 – September 4, 2009.

Retired numbers
 
† Note: No. 18 was re-issued for Peyton Manning after Tripucka gave his approval; it was used by Manning from the 2012 season until his retirement after the 2015 season. Manning's name was added to the retired number's banner as an honorable mention.

Pro Football Hall of Famers

Ring of Fame
The Broncos have a Ring of Fame on the Level 5 facade of Empower Field at Mile High, which honors the following:

Super Bowl MVPs

Colorado Sports Hall of Fame

Staff and head coaches

Head coaches

The most recent head coach of the Broncos was Nathaniel Hackett. On December 26, 2022, ownership announced that Hackett had been fired after he led the team to a disappointing 4-11 record despite entering the season with high expectations.

Current staff

In the media and popular culture
 Tim McKernan, a.k.a. Barrel Man, began wearing a barrel in 1977 after making a $10 (equivalent to $ in ) bet with his brother, Scott, that by wearing one he could get on television. McKernan won the bet, and the barrel he had painted to look like an Orange Crush soda can became his signature costume, and resulted in him becoming one of the Broncos' most recognized fans and a popular mascot. McKernan died on December 5, 2009.
 The animated television show South Park, set in Park County, often mentions the Denver Broncos; show creators Trey Parker and Matt Stone both grew up in Colorado as devout Broncos fans.
 In The Simpsons season 5 episode Cape Feare, when the family are to be given new identities, Homer imagines himself as John Elway, scoring a (consolation) touchdown against San Francisco. Conversely, in the 1996 episode "You Only Move Twice", Hank Scorpio gives Homer Simpson the Denver Broncos as a thank-you gift for helping him. However, Homer complains that he wanted to own the Dallas Cowboys, as the Broncos team that just arrived are playing very sloppy football on his front lawn (a reference to the team losing four Super Bowl appearances, three by significant margins including Super Bowl XII against Dallas). Incidentally, the Broncos were 13–3 in the 1996 season, and won the Super Bowl the next two seasons. Only two seasons later in the Super Bowl-centric episode "Sunday, Cruddy Sunday", Homer chooses Denver as his Super Bowl XXXIII pick over Moe's choice of the Atlanta Falcons. In the episode, "The Bonfire of the Manatees", Homer picks the Broncos to win the Super Bowl over the Seattle Seahawks. The two teams later did play against each other in Super Bowl XLVIII which aired on Fox, the U.S. home of The Simpsons; but the result was a Seahawks victory instead.
 In the 1979 Mork & Mindy episode "Hold That Mork", Mork's character, played by Robin Williams, became the first male cheerleader in Broncos' history. As a member of the "Pony Express", he trotted out on the field at Mile High Stadium during an actual Broncos' game vs. the New England Patriots on November 11, 1979. The episode aired exactly two weeks later.
 Many former Broncos are now in broadcasting, including Shannon Sharpe, Mark Schlereth, Alfred Williams, Tom Jackson, Ed McCaffrey, Brian Griese, David Diaz-Infante, Terrell Davis and Brandon Stokley. Some former Broncos work in radio, KKFN and KDFD in Denver, Colorado. 
 Former tight end and wide receiver Nate Jackson has written and published two nonfiction books, Slow Getting Up and Fantasy Man. His writing about the NFL has appeared in Slate, Deadspin, The Daily Beast, The New York Times, The Wall Street Journal, and BuzzFeed, among others. Jackson also co-hosts the Caveman Poet Society.

Radio and television

The Broncos' flagship radio station is currently KOA, 850AM, a 50,000-watt station owned by iHeartMedia. Dave Logan is the play-by-play announcer, with former Broncos' wide receiver Ed McCaffrey serving as the color commentator beginning in 2012, replacing Brian Griese. Ed McCaffrey was replaced by Rick Lewis. Until 2010, preseason games not selected for airing on national television were shown on KCNC, channel 4, which is a CBS owned-and-operated station, as well as other CBS affiliates around the Rocky Mountain region. On May 26, 2011, the Broncos announced that KUSA channel 9, an NBC affiliate also known as 9NEWS in the Rocky Mountain region, will be the team's new television partner for preseason games.

In 2011, the Broncos began a partnership with KJMN, 92.1 FM, a leading Spanish language radio station owned by Entravision Communications (EVC). The partnership also includes broadcasting rights for a half-hour weekly TV show on KCEC, the local Univision affiliate operated by Entravision Communications.

References
Notes

Further reading
 Dater, Adrian (2007) The Good, the Bad, and the Ugly Denver Broncos: Heart-Pounding, Jaw-Dropping, and Gut-Wrenching Moments from Denver Broncos History. Triumph Books. 
 Frei, Terry (2009) 77: Denver, The Broncos, and A Coming of Age . Taylor Trade Publishing. 
 Morton, Craig and Dater, Adrian (2008) Then Morton Said to Elway...: The Best Denver Broncos Stories Ever Told, Triumph Books. 
 Saccomano, Jim (2007) Game of My Life: Denver Broncos: Memorable Stories of Broncos Football.  Sports Publishing LLC. 
 Saccomano, Jim and Elway, John (2009) Denver Broncos: The Complete Illustrated History. MBI Publishing Company, 
 Sandler, Michael (2007) John Elway and the Denver Broncos: Super Bowl XXXIII.  Bearport Publishing Company. 
 Stewart, Mark (2006)The Denver Broncos. Norwood House Press. 
 Zimmer, Larry (2004) Denver Broncos: Colorful Tales of the Orange and Blue.  Globe Pequot Press.

External links

 
 Denver Broncos at the National Football League official website

 
American Football League teams
National Football League teams
American football teams in Denver
Companies based in Arapahoe County, Colorado
American football teams established in 1960
1960 establishments in Colorado
2022 mergers and acquisitions